Bone Silence is a 2020 hard science fiction novel by Welsh author Alastair Reynolds. This is the third and final novel in the Revenger Trilogy series, with the prequels being Revenger and Shadow Captain. The book was released on January 9, 2020, by Gollancz.

Synopsis

Reception
Russell Letson writing for the Locus Online stated, "This is perfectly good adventure-stuff: colorful crew members, encounters with assorted crooks and spies, space combat, chases and escapes and betrayals. The enduring appeal for me is the setting, starting with the immediate environments of steampunkish solar-sailing spacecraft, all rigging and rivets and water-cooled coil-guns; or the tatty corridors and conduits and drinking-dens of ancient habitats. Even the more respectable kinds of stations are far from the sterile, molded-white-plastic modernism of Kubrick’s 2001." Mark Yon of SFF World wrote, "There is scope for other stories and other ideas to be pursued should Alastair or his publishers wish to do so, but if this is the end of our journey with Adrana and Fura, then the distance travelled by the Ness sisters over the three books, taken as a complete story, is impressive. If you’ve enjoyed the journey so far, Bone Silence should not disappoint."

Awards
In 2021, the novel was nominated for Philip K. Dick Award.

References

External links

2020 science fiction novels
Space opera novels
Novels by Alastair Reynolds
Victor Gollancz Ltd books